Sometime in August is a 2009 German drama film directed by Sebastian Schipper, starring Marie Bäumer, Milan Peschel, André Hennicke and Anna Brüggemann. It tells the story of Thomas and Hanna, a happily married couple settled on the countryside, whose relationship is challenged when they are visited by Tomas' brother and Hanna's goddaughter. The film is loosely based on the 1809 novel Elective Affinities by Johann Wolfgang von Goethe.

The film premiered in the Forum section of the 59th Berlin International Film Festival. It won the Grand Prix at the Cabourg Film Festival.

Cast
 Milan Peschel as Thomas
 Marie Bäumer as Hanna
 Anna Brüggemann as Augustine
 André Hennicke as Friedrich
 Gert Voss as Bo
 Agnes Zeltina as Galina Petrova

Production
The film was produced by Film1 GmbH & Co. KG in collaboration with Senator Film Produktion and Norddeutscher Rundfunk. Filming took place in Hamburg, from 28 August to 21 October 2007.

Reception
Kirk Honeycutt of The Hollywood Reporter wrote: "Goethe seemingly was playing with notions of fate and free will but his work is generally considered enigmatic. For his part, Schipper shows a couple's equilibrium getting upset by outside forces, but he never establishes any reason why this should be." Honeycutt continued: "The four characters -- along with a brief, somewhat inexplicable appearance by Hanna's father and his absurd Russian girlfriend -- never really come alive. The actors are all rather earnest and a score by American singer-songwriter Vic Chesnutt wears soulfulness on its sleeve. But the film never gets at what ails these people. It must be bad chemistry."

References

External links
 

2009 drama films
2009 films
Films based on German novels
Films based on works by Johann Wolfgang von Goethe
Films directed by Sebastian Schipper
German drama films
2000s German-language films
2000s German films